Distimake aureus is a species of vining plant in the bindweed family (Convolvulaceae) commonly known as the yellow morning-glory, yellow woodrose or yuca vine. A woody vine, this species is characterized by its large trumpet-shaped yellow flowers that bloom year-round, though most often after rain. Each of the showy flowers are only open for a single day. It is endemic to Baja California Sur, Mexico, where it can be found twining and climbing over trees, shrubs, and rocks.

Description 

This plant is a perennial woody vine. It is deciduous and may drop its leaves in severe heat. The leaves are palmate, with 5 oblong leaflets, the median leaflet the largest. The edges of the leaflets are smooth and not serrated, unlike a local congener D. quinquefolius which has narrower serrated leaflets and white flowers.

Each flower only blooms for a single day, opening in the morning and closing by the late afternoon.

Distribution 
Endemic to the state of Baja California Sur in Mexico, this species is found from the vicinity of Loreto south to the Cape region of the Baja California peninsula. It is also found on several islands in the Gulf of California.

Uses 
The fleshy roots of the plant are edible.

This species is utilized in cultivation as an ornamental plant. It requires full sun and low water, and needs well-drained soil. It is hardy to US Sunset Zones of 12 to 24.

References

External links 

Convolvulaceae
Flora of Baja California Sur
Endemic flora of Mexico
Natural history of the Peninsular Ranges